Ampelophaga rubiginosa is a moth of the family Sphingidae. It was described by Otto Vasilievich Bremer and William (Vasilii) Grey in 1853. It is found from north-eastern Afghanistan, east around the southern margin of the Himalaya to Yunnan, then throughout China to the Russian Far East, the Korean Peninsula and Japan. It is also found south through Thailand and Vietnam to Sumatra and Peninsular Malaysia.

Description 
The wingspan is 72–100 mm.

Biology 
There is one generation per year in north-eastern China, with adults on wing from June to August. Farther south, there may be up to three generations per year. In Shanghai, adults are on wing from February to October. In Korea, they are found from early May to early August.

Larvae have been recorded feeding on Vitaceae species (including Cayratia, Parthenocissus and Vitis), Hydrangea paniculata and Saurauia.

Subspecies
Ampelophaga rubiginosa rubiginosa
Ampelophaga rubiginosa lohita Kishida & Yano, 2001 (Japan (Kyushu and the Ryukyu Archipelago))
Ampelophaga rubiginosa myosotis Kitching & Cadiou, 2000 (Taiwan)

Gallery

References

rubiginosa
Moths described in 1853
Moths of Asia